My Way is the second album Lester Bowie recorded for the Japanese DIW label and the fifth album by his "Brass Fantasy" group. It was released in 1990 and features performances by Bowie, Gregory Williams, Frank Lacy, Steve Turre, E. J. Allen, Gerald Brezel, Earl Garner, Stanton Davis, Bob Stewart, Ken Crutchfield, Vinnie Johnson and Famoudou Don Moye.

Reception
The Allmusic review by Scott Yanow awarded the album 2½ stars, stating, "this set certainly has its interesting moments, although it is a bit erratic".

Track listing
 "Quasi" (Bruce Purse) - 8:30
 "Who Says" (Turre) - 7:30
 "After Thought" (Purse) - 9:53
 "My Way" (Paul Anka, Claude François, Jacques Revaux, Gilles Thibault) - 10:17
 "I Got You (I Feel Good)" (James Brown) - 6:09
 "Honky Tonk" (Billy Butler, Bill Doggett, Clifford Scott, Berisford "Shep" Shepherd) - 4:45
Recorded at Systems Two, Brooklyn, NY on 22, 24, 25, 26 & 30 January 1990

Personnel
Lester Bowie: trumpet, flugelhorn
Gregory Williams: French horn
Frank Lacy: trombone, vocals
Steve Turre: trombone, conch shell
E. J. Allen: trumpet
Gerald Brezel: trumpet
Earl Garner: trumpet
Stanton Davis: trumpet, piccolo trumpet
Bob Stewart: tuba
Famoudou Don Moye: percussion
Ken Crutchfield: drums
Vinnie Johnson: drums

References

1990 albums
DIW Records albums
Lester Bowie albums